London Buses route 171 is a Transport for London contracted bus route in London, England. Running between Bellingham and Elephant & Castle, it is operated by London Central.

History

1952-1972
Route 171 Commenced operating on 6 April 1952 at Stage 7 of London Transport's post-war "Tram to Buses" conversion scheme to replace Kingsway Subway Tram route 33. It ran as a daily service between Tottenham and West Norwood via Harringay, Manor House, Newington Green, Angel, Rosebery Avenue, Kingsway, Aldwych, Victoria Embankment, Westminster Bridge, Kennington, Brixton, West Norwood (Thurlow Arms) extended Sunday to West Norwood garage). The section between Harringay and Tottenham was new territory, not previously served by London buses.

1973-present
On 18 February 1996, IRA member Edward O'Brien was killed when an improvised explosive device detonated prematurely on the route 171 bus he brought it onto as it was travelling along Aldwych towards King's Cross. It also injured eight other passengers.

Upon being re-tendered, it was retained by London Central with a new contract commencing on 29 April 2006. London Central again successfully tendered to retain the route with a new contract commencing on 30 April 2011.

The route was withdrawn between Elephant & Castle and Holborn Station in 2019. It terminates at Lambeth Road near E&C, taking over from route 468, which now terminates at Borough Road.

Current route
Route 171 operates via these primary locations:
 Bellingham, Catford Bus Garage
 Catford Bridge railway station 
 Catford railway station 
 Crofton Park railway station 
 Brockley Cross for Brockley railway station  
 New Cross station  
 New Cross Gate station  
 Queens Road Peckham station  
 Camberwell Green
 Walworth
 Elephant & Castle station

References

External links
 

Bus routes in London
Transport in the London Borough of Lambeth
Transport in the London Borough of Lewisham
Transport in the London Borough of Southwark
Transport in the City of Westminster